Hannah Moore (born August 22, 1996) is an American swimmer, specialising in open water events. She competed in the women's 5 km event at the 2019 World Aquatics Championships, winning the bronze medal.

References

External links
 

 
 

1996 births
Living people
American female swimmers
World Aquatics Championships medalists in open water swimming
Universiade medalists in swimming
Universiade bronze medalists for the United States
Swimmers at the 2014 Summer Youth Olympics
Place of birth missing (living people)
Youth Olympic gold medalists for the United States
Female long-distance swimmers
Medalists at the 2017 Summer Universiade
21st-century American women